Scythris lycii is a moth species of the family Scythrididae. It was described by Mark I. Falkovitsh in 1969. It is found in Turkmenistan and Uzbekistan.

References

lycii
Moths described in 1969
Moths of Asia